Howells & Stokes was an American architectural firm founded in 1897 by John Mead Howells and Isaac Newton Phelps Stokes. The firm dissolved in 1917.

Howells & Stokes designed, among other structures, St. Paul's Chapel at Columbia University; Woodbridge Hall, part of the Hewitt Quadrangle on the campus of Yale University in New Haven, Connecticut; the Engineering Quadrangle at Pratt Institute; and office buildings in New York City, Seattle, San Francisco, and Providence, Rhode Island. 

The firm was hired to plan the redevelopment of the original downtown Seattle site of the University of Washington. The Metropolitan Tract was, at the time, the largest development of a downtown site undertaken in the United States. Abraham H. Albertson represented the firm in Seattle and supervised construction of the project as well San Francisco's Royal Insurance Building.

Following their earlier close collaboration on these and other projects, the partners chose to pursue separate interests, with Howells primarily engaging in commercial skyscraper construction and Stokes in the design of public housing projects in New York City.

Selected works
 Centennial Hall at Edward Waters College
 Cobb Building (Seattle)
 Engineering Quadrangle at Pratt Institute
 Royal Insurance Building, San Francisco
 St. Paul's Chapel (Columbia University)
 Turk's Head Building

References

External links
 Pacific Coast Architecture Database entry
 Howells & Stokes at Emporis
 Howells & Stokes archives, Held by the Department of Drawings & Archives, Avery Architectural & Fine Arts Library, Columbia University.

Architecture firms of the United States